Dolmar is a former Verwaltungsgemeinschaft ("collective municipality") in the district Schmalkalden-Meiningen, in Thuringia, Germany. The seat of the Verwaltungsgemeinschaft was in Schwarza. It was disbanded on 1 January 2012.

The Verwaltungsgemeinschaft Dolmar consisted of the following municipalities:
Christes 
Dillstädt 
Kühndorf 
Rohr 
Schwarza
Utendorf

Former Verwaltungsgemeinschaften in Thuringia